Astara Television Tower, is a steel  tall Azerbaijani lattice television tower located in the city of Astara, on the southeastern part of the Republic of Azerbaijan.  The tower is used for transmitting FM Radio and TV-broadcasting as well as being used as a mobile repeater.

Design
The tower is a lattice tower with a horizontal cross and a guyed antenna at the tower's pinnacle.

Transmission 

The Astara TV Tower transmits FM-/TV-broadcasting throughout the city of Astara. For more information, see the table below.

See also 

Lattice tower
Astara
AzTV
TRT
ORT

References

External links 
Astara TV Tower - SkyscraperPage Forum

Astara/TV Tower FM transmitter info

Lattice towers
Towers in Azerbaijan
Towers completed in 1981
Astara District